Blue Bells Public School is a co-educational English medium school located in Sector 10 Gurgaon. Haryana, India, serving students from class Nursery to XII.

History 
The construction of the school started in October 2000. The school became functional in 2003 with a total of 154 students. The school got affiliated to the CBSE Board in 2010-11.

Infrastructure 

Academic Infrastructure includes library, computer lab, science lab, math lab, sports, medical facilities, and auditorium academic.

Social Campaigns 
The school organises social campaigns and events regularly:

 Say No to One Time Use Plastic in October 2019
 Water Conservation at Neernidhi (Annual Fest)
 Learning Unbound (Academic Carnival)
 breast and cervical cancer awareness at Empezar (Health & Wellness Fiesta)
 Tree Plantation drive to celebrate Van Mahotsav

Awards and recognition 

 First runner up at The two-match international friendly cricket series (December 2019)
 Second Position in the Industrial Design Category in Industrial Design Championship (August 2018)
 First position at the International chapter of 8th International Robotronics Competition
 Third runner up in under-16 girls 300-metre time-trial Quads rinkrace at CBSE skating championship

References 

Schools in Haryana
Lists of schools in India